Napecoetes crossospila is a moth in the Psychidae family. It was described by Turner in 1913. It is found in Australia.

References

Natural History Museum Lepidoptera generic names catalog

Psychidae
Moths described in 1913